Irène Possemiers (born 28 May 1934) is a Belgian former swimmer. She competed in the women's 4 × 100 metre freestyle relay at the 1952 Summer Olympics.

References

1934 births
Living people
Belgian female freestyle swimmers
Olympic swimmers of Belgium
Swimmers at the 1952 Summer Olympics
Swimmers from Antwerp